Will Rahmer (born September 30, 1969) is an American musician.

Rahmer was the vocalist in the death metal band Incantation temporarily during mid-1990, before leaving to form Mortician with drummer Matt Sicher. Rahmer is the lyricist, vocalist, and bassist for Mortician, and is heavily influenced by horror movies, of which he is a collector, having acquired over 500 films. Known for his extremely guttural vocals, Rahmer is the co-founder of New York Death Militia and the founder of Redrum Records.

Discography

Demos
 Rehearsal 12/14/89
 Demo #1 1990

Albums
 Hacked Up for Barbecue (1996)
 Chainsaw Dismemberment (1999)
 Domain of Death (2001)
 Darkest Day of Horror Tour Edition (2002)
 Darkest Day of Horror (2003)
 Re-Animated Dead Flesh (2004)

EPs and singles
 "Brutally Mutilated" (7" single, 1990)
 "Mortal Massacre" (7" single, 1991)
 Mortal Massacre (EP, 1993)
 "House by the Cemetery" (7" single, 1994)
 House by the Cemetery (EP, 1995)
 "Zombie Apocalypse" (7" single, 1998)
 Zombie Apocalypse (EP, 1998)
 Living Dead (Split, 2004)

Compilations
Gummo soundtrack

Live albums
 The Final Bloodbath Session (Live drummer studio sessions, 2002)
 Zombie Massacre Live! (2004)

References

External links
Mortician Official Site
New York Death Militia
Redrum Records page

1969 births
Living people
Death metal musicians
American heavy metal singers
American heavy metal bass guitarists
American male bass guitarists
People from Yonkers, New York
20th-century American bass guitarists
20th-century American male musicians